Baudouin Oosterlynck (born November 19, 1946, in Kortrijk) is a Belgian composer, sound artist and visual artist. He is notable for his early musique concrète works and his later installation pieces and objets d'art.  Among his works are a series of 23 preludes, 3 overtures, 5 oratorios, and a sonata, collectively known as Variations du silence, that consist of recordings of the ambient sound in particular locations selected by the composer.  He has also designed a variety of highly sensitive instruments for listening.

Discography
 1975-1978, 4 LP box / 4 CD box, Metaphon 001, 2008 + 78 page booklet : prepared piano, voice, objects

Honours, decorations, awards and distinctions
He has been a member of the Royal Academy of Science, Letters and Fine Arts of Belgium since 2007.

References/Notes and references

External links
 Artist's website

Belgian contemporary artists
Belgian performance artists
People from Kortrijk
1946 births
Living people
Members of the Royal Academy of Belgium